Lanjak Entimau Wildlife Sanctuary is a  large protected area on the island of Borneo in Sarawak, Malaysia. It is significant for orangutan conservation. Together with Batang Ai National Park these protected areas host an estimated 1,400 orangutans. Hunting and illegal logging are only minor problems in these areas, but could become serious if not monitored, especially because the areas are contiguous with Indonesia, where illegal logging is rampant.

Together with the Betung Kerihun National Park in Indonesia, it has been proposed to form a World Heritage Site named the "Transborder Rainforest Heritage of Borneo".

See also
Deforestation in Borneo

References

External links
Forestry Sarawak - Information about the park

Wildlife sanctuaries of Malaysia
Borneo
Protected areas of Sarawak
Borneo lowland rain forests